Sergio Antonio Núñez Morales (born 30 April 1982) is a Chilean former professional footballer who played as a forward for clubs in Chile, Mexico and Argentina.

Career
A forward, Núñez is a product of Cobreloa youth system, he made appearances for the club in the 2001 Chilean Primera División.

In the Chilean Primera División, he also played for Santiago Wanderers, Deportes La Serena and Unión San Felipe. In the Primera B, he played for Deportes Iquique on loan from Cobreloa, Deportes Antofagasta, Coquimbo Unido, San Marcos de Arica and Lota Schwager. In February 2015, he was released from Lota Schwager after having a fight with his fellow Emanuel Vargas.

With Coquimbo Unido, they won the 2014 Clausura of the Primera B.

Honours
Coquimbo Unido
 Primera B: 2014 Clausura,

References

External links
 
 
 Sergio Núñez at PlaymakerStats.com

1982 births
Living people
Chilean footballers
Chilean expatriate footballers
Cobreloa footballers
Deportes Iquique footballers
C.D. Antofagasta footballers
Atlante F.C. footballers
Santiago Wanderers footballers
Deportes La Serena footballers
Coquimbo Unido footballers
San Marcos de Arica footballers
Unión San Felipe footballers
Lota Schwager footballers
Comisión de Actividades Infantiles footballers
Chilean Primera División players
Primera B de Chile players
Ascenso MX players
Segunda División Profesional de Chile players
Torneo Argentino A players
Chilean expatriate sportspeople in Mexico
Chilean expatriate sportspeople in Argentina
Expatriate footballers in Mexico
Expatriate footballers in Argentina
Association football forwards
Place of birth missing (living people)